James E. Baechtold (December 9, 1927 – August 29, 2011) was an American basketball player and professor at Eastern Kentucky University.

Basketball career

A graduate of Moon High School in Coraopolis, Pennsylvania, Baechtold played collegiately for Eastern Kentucky University (1948–1952).

Baechtold was selected by the Baltimore Bullets in the 1st round (2nd pick overall) of the 1952 NBA draft.

He played for the Bullets (1952–53) and New York Knicks (1953–57) in the NBA for 321 games, averaging 9.7 points and 3.1 rebounds.

From 1962 through 1966, Baechtold served as Eastern Kentucky University’s head basketball coach. In his five seasons, he coached two OVC runners-up and the 1965 conference championship team. He was the OVC Coach-of-the-Year in 1965. Afterwards, he served for several years as an associate professor in the University's Parks and Recreation Department.

References

External links
 

1927 births
2011 deaths
Basketball coaches from Pennsylvania
Basketball players from Pennsylvania
Baltimore Bullets (1944–1954) draft picks
Baltimore Bullets (1944–1954) players
Eastern Kentucky Colonels men's basketball coaches
Eastern Kentucky Colonels men's basketball players
New York Knicks players
Sportspeople from McKeesport, Pennsylvania
American men's basketball players
Forwards (basketball)
Guards (basketball)